Tari Kola (also Romanized as Tārī Kolā) is a village in Gatab-e Shomali Rural District, Gatab District, Babol County, Mazandaran Province, Iran. At the 2006 census, its population was 194, in 49 families.

References 

Populated places in Babol County